The 2000 Eye Group British Open Championships was held at the Edgbaston Priory Club with the later stages at the National Indoor Arena from 9–15 October 2000. David Evans won the title defeating Paul Price in the final. Bradley Ball replaced number one seed Peter Nicol in the main draw following the withdrawal of Nicol from the tournament with a stress fracture of the shin.

Seeds

Draw and results

Final Qualifying round

+ Lucky loser

Main draw

References

Men's British Open Squash Championships
Squash in England
Men's British Open
Men's British Open Squash Championship
Men's British Open Squash Championship
2000s in Birmingham, West Midlands
Sports competitions in Birmingham, West Midlands